The Battle of Coulmiers was fought on 9 November 1870 between French and Bavarian forces during the Franco-Prussian War, ending in French victory.

The struggle 
The Army of the Loire, under General D'Aurelle de Paladines, surprised a Bavarian army under Ludwig Freiherr von und zu der Tann-Rathsamhausen at the village of Coulmiers, west of Orléans. The French artillery detachment shelled the Bavarian camp with percussion-fused shells, causing panic in the camp and causing the Bavarian garrison to retreat in disorder during a direct bayonet charge by French infantry. Forcing the Bavarian forces into retreating from the battlefield led to one of the very few French victories in the war.

Aftermath 
The news of Coulmiers was relayed to besieged Paris and caused great excitement in the city, prompting the Government of National Defense within the city to launch "the Great Sortie" against the Prussian siege lines around the city. At the same time, the Army of the Loire stopped its march towards Paris, conforming to the wishes of General D'Aurelle, who argued that his raw, badly-supplied men needed time to rest. Despite an urging Léon Gambetta, Aurelles locked himself into Orleans. Coulmiers's victory would not be exploited and reinforced German troops would eventually retake Orleans.

References 

 Colonel Rousset, Histoire générale de la Guerre franco-allemande, tome 2, édition Jules Tallandier, Paris.

External links
 

Coulmiers
Coulmiers
History of Loiret
1870 in France
Conflicts in 1870